Iain Brambell (born November 10, 1973) was born and raised in Brentwood Bay, British Columbia. Brambell is a three time Canadian  Olympic rower having competed in Sydney 2000, Athens 2004 and Beijing 2008. He is a graduate of Brock University and The University of Western Ontario. 

He won a bronze medal at the 2002 world championships in Seville, Spain in the men's lightweight fours event.

At the 2008 Summer Olympics he won a Bronze in the Men's Lightweight Four with Mike Lewis, Liam Parsons and Jon Beare.

Brambell has successfully transitioned from being a high performance athlete to a high performance sport administrator. He has held high performance advisory roles within the Australian Sport Commission & Own The Podium, and High Performance Director roles with Rowing Canada Aviron and Australian Sailing.

References

External links
Iain Brambell on Real Champions
 Profile at Rowing Canada

1973 births
Brock University alumni
Canadian expatriate sportspeople in Australia
Canadian male rowers
University of Western Ontario alumni
Living people
Olympic rowers of Canada
Olympic bronze medalists for Canada
Rowers at the 2000 Summer Olympics
Rowers at the 2004 Summer Olympics
Rowers at the 2008 Summer Olympics
People from the Capital Regional District
Sportspeople from British Columbia
Olympic medalists in rowing
Medalists at the 2008 Summer Olympics
Pan American Games medalists in rowing
Pan American Games silver medalists for Canada
Rowers at the 2003 Pan American Games